Brookton to Corrigin railway (also known when under construction  in 1913 as the Brookton to Kunjinn railway) was a railway line in the Western Australian wheatbelt, between Brookton and Corrigin. 

The planning and opening were significant events in the districts affected.

When the line was opened in 1915, it was 55 miles 75 chains in length. It was constructed by the Public Works Department (Western Australia).

It connected the Great Southern Railway route with the Merredin to Narrogin railway line, providing railway access for farmers in the region.

The stopping places on the line in 1915 between the two main towns were:

 Weam
 Nalya
 Aldersyde
 Mears
 Kweda
 Bulyee
 Lomos
 Jubuk
 Kunjinn

Services were generally sparse. By the 1930s it was down to one service a week.

However seasonal demand for the service in wheat delivery was evident in the 1940s.

Floods affected services at various stages in the lines history.

The railway line ceased operating in 1957.

References 

Wheatbelt railway lines of Western Australia
1915 establishments in Australia
1957 disestablishments in Australia